My Song is an album by jazz musician Keith Jarrett recorded in November 1977 and released by ECM Records in June 1978. After Belonging (1974) this would be the second studio album by Jarrett's 'European Quartet' featuring Jan Garbarek, Palle Danielsson and Jon Christensen.

Reception 
The AllMusic review by Scott Yanow awarded the album 4.5 stars, stating, "Due to the popularity of the haunting "My Song," this album is the best known of the Jarrett-Garbarek collaborations and it actually is their most rewarding meeting on record. Jarrett contributed all six compositions and the results are relaxed and introspective yet full of inner tension.".

Writing for the now defunct jazz magazine Jazz.com, Ted Gioia rated 99/100 the track The Journey Home stating that:

Track listing
All compositions by Keith Jarrett.

 "Questar" - 9:12
 "My Song" - 6:12
 "Tabarka" - 9:13  
 "Country" - 5:03
 "Mandala" - 8:20
 "The Journey Home" - 10:34

Personnel 
 Keith Jarrett - piano, percussion
 Jan Garbarek - tenor and soprano saxophones
 Palle Danielsson - bass
 Jon Christensen - drums

'''Production
 Manfred Eicher - producer
 Jan Erik Kongshaug - recording engineer
 Roberto Masotti - photo
 Barbara Wojirsch - cover design and layout

References 

Keith Jarrett albums
Jan Garbarek albums
1978 albums
ECM Records albums
Albums produced by Manfred Eicher